The Big Wing, also known as a Balbo, was an air fighting tactic proposed during the Battle of Britain by 12 Group commander Air Vice-Marshal Trafford Leigh-Mallory and Acting Squadron Leader Douglas Bader. In essence, the tactic involved meeting incoming Luftwaffe bombing raids in strength with a wing-shaped formation of three to five squadrons. In the Battle, this tactic was employed by the Duxford Wing, under Bader's command.

The name "Balbo" refers to Italo Balbo, an Italian air force officer and fascist political leader famous for leading large formations of aircraft on long distance flights before the war.

History

Background 
Air Vice-Marshal Keith Park was the commanding officer of Fighter Command's No. 11 Group RAF  which covered southern England below a line from the East Anglian coast to the Isle of Wight. As such it faced most Luftwaffe attacks. Air Chief Marshal Sir Hugh Dowding, commanding officer of RAF Fighter Command, had put a huge amount of effort into developing the world's first integrated air defence system, incorporating the Chain Home radar stations, Royal Observer Corps ground observation posts, telecommunications and information processing. Using the tactics devised by Sir Hugh Dowding, Park met the raids with individual squadrons, which he considered to be the most flexible and effective use of his aircraft, particularly in light of the shallow depth of penetration of British airspace by the Luftwaffe. He used hit and run tactics, with an enemy raid potentially being engaged by several squadrons in turn. The tactic had been questioned by many of Park's subordinates, who were appalled by the high losses amongst the squadrons of 11 Group. In this battle of attrition they wanted to employ larger formations to provide mutual protection and reduce casualties.

Big Wing 
Leigh-Mallory, the commander of the neighbouring No. 12 Group RAF (12 Group) to the north, was an advocate of a Big Wing policy, causing enormous friction in his relationship with Park. One of Leigh-Mallory's subordinates was the acting leader of No. 242 (Canadian) Squadron RAF (242 Squadron), Douglas Bader, who had flown in Park's Big Wings over Dunkirk a few weeks earlier. Experience covering the French beaches against air attack had convinced Bader that large formations were essential and with Leigh-Mallory's blessing, a wing was formed at RAF Duxford (one of the closest stations to the boundary between 11 and 12 Groups) to try to prove the Big Wing theory. Supported by Duxford station commander Group Captain "Woody" Woodhall, Bader's wing theory was developed over the next few days and initially involved three squadrons; No. 242 Squadron RAF (Canadians) and No. 310 (Czech) Squadron RAF, both flying Hawker Hurricanes and No. 19 Squadron RAF (19 Squadron), based at nearby RAF Fowlmere flying Supermarine Spitfires.

On 7 September 1940, the Big Wing was scrambled operationally for the first time, to patrol North Weald but the formation arrived late. Bader acknowledged the fact that they were too slow forming up and for the flight to the patrol area the formation was too disjointed; the Big Wing claimed 11 enemy aircraft destroyed for the loss of one fighter. In September 1940, the wing was sent up several times to try to disrupt Luftwaffe raiders. The Duxford Big Wing was not an organised and rehearsed military unit, merely an ad-hoc collection of squadrons led by one of Fighter Command's less experienced squadron leaders. Between Leigh-Mallory and Bader there was no planning on how to use a Big Wing nor an assessment of its achievements. On 9 September, the Hurricanes of No. 302 Polish Fighter Squadron (302 Squadron) and the Spitfires of No. 611 Squadron RAF (611 Squadron), were allocated to the "Big Wing" and again Park requested protection of 11 Group airfields, with much the same results of 7 September.

Park had experimented with large wings (covering the Dunkirk evacuation in May 1940) and insisted that they were unwieldy, difficult to manoeuvre into position and rarely in the right place when needed. The 11 Group squadrons were closer to the Luftwaffe than 12 Group and Park pointed out that there was insufficient time over Kent and Sussex for a large formation to gain altitude against the incoming raids. Bader countered by pointing out that his wing could be used as a reserve for 11 Group. Positioned well away from the Luftwaffe bases in France he could be in place at altitude when the wing was needed, providing adequate early warning was given. The best early warning possible was provided to 12 Group. Bader further delayed deployment of 12 Group fighters by insisting he lead the Big Wing; to do this he had to fly 242 Squadron to Duxford from RAF Coltishall every day. Bader wanted time to fly to Duxford, land, take-off again, then form a Big Wing; the amount of early warning required for this was wildly unrealistic.

The Duxford Big Wing comprised Hurricane and Spitfire squadrons—the Spitfires were slowed by having to fly and climb at the same speed as the slower Hurricanes. Bader did not always follow ground control instructions (GCI) and often flew into 11 Group on his own initiative. For such a large formation to succeed, it needed good planning and training; its leadership had to follow Fighter Command's battle plan but this was blatantly disregarded. If Leigh-Mallory had a vested interest in the Big Wing, then he had a responsibility to make sure that at least it was organised properly. This clash of opinions between the 11 and 12 group commanders was left unresolved by Leigh-Mallory and Dowding. Subsequent events, in which Dowding retired from his post at Fighter Command and Leigh-Mallory was promoted to command 11 Group, show that Leigh-Mallory's arguments had the sympathies of the senior officers of the RAF. These sympathies could have been due to tensions between these officers and Dowding rather than how Britain could be most effectively defended.

In Spitfire: Portrait of a Legend, Leo McKinstry cites sources saying that Dowding was widely criticised after the Battle in RAF reviews of his strategy for keeping the control of 11 Group and 12 Group resources separate under Park and Leigh-Mallory, instead of uniting them under one command or at least coordinating them as one group. The effect of this decision was a lack of coordination between the groups, which often meant the aircraft of 11 Group were fully committed, while those of 12 Group sat idle. A letter by Park in 1968, quoted by McKinstry, illustrates the problem.

According to McInstry, in another letter Park wrote at the time he said, "Frankly I was more worried at the lack of cooperation (with Leigh-Mallory), than I was about out-witting the massed German raids".

What has been described   as an "even-handed" assessment of the affair was published in the Air Ministry's Air Historical Branch history, written shortly after the battle and published in 1941,

This is the Air Ministry view, of which the most senior individuals were involved in using the Big Wing theory as the means to conspire against Dowding. Given this and the animosity towards Dowding, the Air Ministry view of the Battle of Britain cannot be said to be "even-handed". As first published by the Air Ministry there was no mention of Dowding or Park; it was withdrawn and a revised version issued in 1943 at Winston Churchill's insistence. Further evidence of this conflict can also be seen in a memo, again cited by McKinstry, which Leigh-Mallory sent to Park during the Battle, "Full explanation required why 11 Group fighters have shot down enemy fighters over 12 Gp area". This is more than a little ironic given that 12 Group was expected to reinforce the defence in 11 Group (by shooting enemy aircraft down) but instead a Big Wing was sent, often to the wrong place, causing more disruption to the well thought-out plans of 11 Group than to the Luftwaffe.

Effectiveness
After the Battle of Britain Leigh-Mallory never really had a chance to use the Big Wing defensively again, and it quickly mutated from a defensive to an offensive formation—Bader would eventually lead one of these new wings on massive fighter sweeps over France. To this day there is debate over the effectiveness of the "Big Wing" as it was used during the Battle. Although Leigh-Mallory and Bader argued it was a great success, post-war analysis suggests the actual number of German aircraft shot down by the wing was probably a fraction of those claimed (the claims for the Big Wing were never credible even at the time. On 15 September 1940, the Big Wing was scrambled twice against incoming raids and claimed 52 kills, eight probables and others damaged. (German records showed that six aircraft were lost). Some senior officers like Leigh-Mallory and Sholto Douglas wanted to believe these claims so that they could use the Big Wing as a political tool against Dowding. This would seem to support the idea that, for a "Big Wing", there were "not enough enemy to go around"; the Wing had too high a concentration of aircraft in the same air space looking for targets.

It could be argued that 12 Group had more time to get fighters into position but even then it failed to do so. When 11 Group was stretched to its limits and required support, due to the delay imposed by 12 Group, 11 Group airfields were left undefended. This was due not only to time wasted in forming up the Big Wing but also due to 12 Group commanders not following 11 Group's instructions and thus arriving in the wrong place. Not only did 12 Group fail to support 11 Group, they left their own airfields undefended; a large portion of UK airspace was left undefended while Leigh-Mallory and Bader tested their Big Wing theory. The time taken to form a Big Wing also wasted fuel and combined with the limited range of the fighters, reduced time over the combat zone. When 10 Group was asked to provide cover for 11 Group in similar circumstances, it was provided and 11 Group airfields defended.

Casualties for the "Big Wing" were significantly lower than in the smaller formations—suggesting that they did indeed benefit from protection in numbers. The "Big Wing" invariably joined combat with the enemy over Northern London, where the German fighter escort was at the very limit of its range and  effectiveness. Consequently, the Big Wing also made very few interceptions, and as a result lower casualties would be expected on both sides. Park's tactics (which had included the occasional use of two- and three-squadron wings) were correct for the conditions he had to fight under. The most powerful argument against the Big Wing in the Battle of Britain is that without a clear idea of a target as a raid assembled over France, it was impossible for the Big Wing to get airborne and form up in time to meet it.

Another argument against the use of the Duxford Big Wing was that it was never a serious tactical proposition. It was formed after a telephone discussion between Leigh Mallory and Bader and there was no planning, protocols for its operation or discussion (let alone agreement) within Fighter Command. Leigh-Mallory did not question Bader's claims or critically assess the Big Wing's results. For a senior commander to take the word of an inexperienced junior officer and commit to such a poorly planned experiment at a critical time is questionable. The interceptions by the Big Wing only occurred over a short period of time in September, when the Luftwaffe switched from military targets and airfields to daylight raids on London. The Luftwaffe bombers were at their most vulnerable when they were at the limit of the range of the escorting Messerschmitt Bf 109s and many German fighters had already expended their fuel in combat with 11 Group aircraft over Kent.

However, when encountered by the Luftwaffe on 15 September, the Big Wing had an immense psychological impact. Having been told that the RAF was down to its last 50 fighters by their leaders, Luftwaffe aircrew were continuously attacked on the run over Kent, only to be confronted by a further formation of 60 RAF aircraft over London, just as their escort reached the limit of their range. This led to further demoralization in the Luftwaffe. One reason for this level of surprise was that a recent large Luftwaffe fighter sweep had encountered little resistance, confirming the Luftwaffe leaders' belief that there were few RAF fighters left; in fact Park had recognised this fighter sweep as a ruse to get his fighters into the air; with no threat of bombing he had kept his fighters on the ground.

While not effective as a fighting tactic, the Big Wing, along with some blatant manipulation of statistics, worked as a political tool for those against Dowding. Dowding had clashed with Hugh Trenchard (founder of the RAF) while both were Royal Flying Corps commanders during the First World War. Trenchard was retired by the Second World War but was a Marshal of the RAF and still influential at the highest level in the RAF. He supported the theory of the "knock out blow", where air attack was fought by counter-attack with bombers, not defence by fighters and this view was shared by many senior RAF and Air Ministry personnel. Despite this RAF policy, Dowding got enough political support to build up Fighter Command into a very effective weapon, the weapon that won the Battle of Britain. In 1940 (and arguably throughout the war) Bomber Command was in no way capable of delivering a knock out blow to Germany, so the pro-bomber advocates were severely embarrassed by the success of Fighter Command. Dowding's "stuffy" personality and unwillingness to fight this political battle also contributed to his downfall. The Big Wing débâcle was a smokescreen manipulated by his political enemies to bring him down. It is understandable that Dowding did not fight back given the stress he had been under for the best part of a year, first to conserve Fighter Command, then to oversee the long battle of attrition against the Luftwaffe.

Big Wing exercise
The use of a Big Wing in 11 Group was explored by Fighter Command in paper exercises run by Leigh-Mallory in January 1941. The intention was to prove the superiority of large formations using the circumstances of a real attack on the Kenley, Biggin Hill and Hornchurch sectors on 6 September 1940. Leigh-Mallory mismanaged the operation, permitting the raid to progress unhindered, resulting in Kenley and Biggin Hill airbases being "bombed" while their aircraft were still on the ground. One of Park's former controllers explained Leigh-Mallory's mistakes to him. He replied that he would do better next time and that if a large-scale raid approached he would permit it to bomb its target and intercept it in force on its return to France. The enemy, he believed, would be so badly mauled that there would be no more raids.

See also
 British military history of World War II

References
Notes

Further reading 
 
 Bungay, Steven. The Most Dangerous Enemy: A History of the Battle of Britain. (Aurum Press, 2001).
 Davison, Martin and Taylor, James.Spitfire Ace: Flying the Battle of Britain. (Pan Books, 2004).
.
 Dixon, Jack. Dowding & Churchill. (Pen and Sword Books, 2008)
 Fisher, David E. A Race On The Edge Of Time. New York, Athena Books 1989 .
 James, T.C.G.The Battle of Britain. Royal Air Force Official Histories, Air Defence of Great Britain, vol2. (Frank Cass, 2000)
 
 
 Ray, John. The Battle of Britain: Dowding and the First Victory, 1940 (aka The Battle of Britain: New Perspectives). (Cassell, 2000).
 Sarkar, Dilip. Bader's Duxford Fighters: The Big Wing Controversy. (Victory Books International, 2006).
 Turner, John Frayn. The Bader Wing. (Pen and Sword Books, 2007).

Aerial warfare tactics
Battle of Britain